Road 92 is a road in Iran. The western part of it is a part of Shiraz-Bandarabbas road. The central part passes northern Hamun Jazmurian Lake. The eastern part connects Iranshahr to Saravan.

References

External links 

 Iran road map on Young Journalists Club

Roads in Iran